The 1964 Houston Oilers season was the fifth season for the Houston Oilers as a professional AFL franchise; The team failed to improve on their previous output of 6–8, winning only four games. They failed to qualify for the playoffs for the second consecutive season. It was their final season at Jeppesen Stadium before moving their home games to Rice Stadium the following season.

Season schedule

Standings

References 

Houston Oilers seasons
Houston Oilers
Houston